Paul Moerschbacher (July 22, 1916 – June 9, 2010), better known as Paul Moer, was an American jazz pianist.

Moer attended the University of Miami, graduating in 1951, and following this played frequently on the West Coast jazz scene with Benny Carter, Vido Musso, Zoot Sims, Stan Getz, Bill Holman, and Shorty Rogers. Moer did extensive work in Los Angeles studios as a pianist and an arranger. He led his own trio in the late 1950s with Jimmy Bond and Frank Butler. In 1960 he toured Australia with Benny Carter. He also recorded with Charles Mingus, Jack Montrose, John Graas, Paul Horn (1960–63), Ruth Price, and Buddy DeFranco.

Moer played little after the 1960s, though he made a comeback with a release in 1991 of Elmo Hope tunes.

Discography
As leader
 1959 The Contemporary Jazz Classics of the Paul Moer Trio
 1961 Live at the Pour House 
 1991 Plays the Music of Elmo Hope
 2005 Get Swinging

As sideman

With Jack Montrose
 1954 Arranged by Montrose (Pacific Jazz)
 1955 Jack Montrose Sextet  (Pacific Jazz)
 1956 Arranged/Played/Composed by Jack Montrose (Atlantic)

With John Graas
 1958 International Premiere in Jazz 
 1958 Jazzmantics
 2004 Westlake Bounce
 2005 Jazz-Lab 1&2

With Paul Horn
 1960 Something Blue
 1961 The Sound of Paul Horn (Columbia)
 1962 Profile of a Jazz Musician (Columbia)

With Jimmy Witherspoon
 1959 Singin' the Blues
 1997 Tougher Than Tough

With Dave Pell
 1958 A Pell of a Time
 2004 Say It With Music

With Jack Sheldon
 1959 Jack's Groove
 2005 Complete College Goes to Jazz

With others
 1961 Yazz Per Favore, Emil Richards
 1995 The Complete Capitol Recordings, Paul Whiteman
 2000 Many a Wonderful Moment, Rosemary Clooney
 2004 Live at Peacock Lane, Maynard Ferguson
 2005 Complete Recordings, Bob Gordon
 2006 Chet Baker & Art Pepper: Complete Recordings
 2006 Complete Recordings, Billy Usselton

References

Scott Yanow, [ Paul Moer] at Allmusic

American jazz pianists
American male pianists
West Coast jazz pianists
1916 births
2010 deaths
20th-century American pianists
20th-century American male musicians
American male jazz musicians
University of Miami alumni